Hockey Club Csíkszereda ( HC Miercurea Ciuc in Romanian) was a Romanian ice hockey team from Miercurea Ciuc, (Csíkszereda in Hungarian), Romania.

Achievements 

MOL Liga:
Winners (1) : 2009

External links
 Official site

Ice hockey teams in Romania
Miercurea Ciuc
Erste Liga (ice hockey) teams
Defunct ice hockey teams in Europe